Pembrokeshire Coast National Park is a national park along the Pembrokeshire coast in west Wales.

It was established as a National Park in 1952. It is one of three national parks in Wales, the others being the Brecon Beacons and Snowdonia. It is the only national park in the United Kingdom to consist largely of coastal landscapes.

Landscape

See also Geology of the Pembrokeshire Coast National Park

The National Park has a varied landscape of rugged cliffs, sandy beaches, wooded estuaries, wild inland hills, the moorland of the Preseli Hills and the wooded  valley. There are four distinct sections: clockwise these are the south Pembrokeshire coast, including Caldey Island; the  estuary; the St Bride's Bay coast, including the coastal islands; and the Preseli Hills.
	

The geology of the area is of particular interest with many good exposures both inland and along the coast, exhibiting a variety of rock types and structural features such as natural arches, stacks, rock folding and sea caves. A stack of note is Elegug Stacks, two large detached pillars of limestone which in the spring provide valued nesting sites for razorbills and guillemots. In the west, the National Park is dominated by the broad sweep of St Bride's Bay, bounded at its northern end by Ramsey Island, near St David's peninsula, and at its southern end by Skomer. The southern coast is another contrast, with the limestone plateau and cliffs of the Castlemartin peninsula, the steep-sided wooded valleys inland from Amroth; the Bosherston lakes — now, like much of the coastal strip, in the care of the National Trust — and the tourist resorts of Tenby and Saundersfoot. Between the western and southern areas of the National Park lies the Milford Haven waterway, where the tranquil  estuary feeds into one of the finest natural deep water harbours in the world.

The National Park includes many sites (such as ) of historic and archaeological importance and areas which are of national or international nature conservation significance in their own right, including 7 Special Areas of Conservation, a Marine Nature Reserve, 6 national nature reserves and 75 Sites of Special Scientific Interest.

In 2011 National Geographic Traveler magazine voted Pembrokeshire the second best coastal destination in the world for sustainable tourism.

Pembrokeshire Coast Path

The Pembrokeshire Coast Path is a designated National Trail.

The southern end of the path is at Amroth.

Administration
The Park is managed by Pembrokeshire Coast National Park Authority, which has around 150 staff and a committee of 18 members. The Authority's purposes are to conserve and enhance the National Park, and encourage the public to enjoy and understand it. In pursuing these purposes, the authority has a duty to foster the social and economic well-being of the communities within its boundaries. Its offices are in Pembroke Dock. The Chief Executive is Tegryn Jones.

The Authority also manages the entire length of the Pembrokeshire Coast Path, a  national trail which lies almost entirely within the Pembrokeshire Coast National Park.

Beaches

Over the years Pembrokeshire's beaches, all of which lie in the National Park, have been awarded many International Blue Flag Awards (10 in 2014), 47 Green Coast Awards (15 in 2011) and 106 Seaside Awards (31 in 2011).  In 2011 it also had 39 beaches recommended by the Marine Conservation Society.

Beaches in the park include:

 
 Amroth
 Barafundle Bay
 Broad Haven
 Broad Haven South
 Freshwater East
 Freshwater West
 Manorbier
 Marloes
 Newgale
 Newport
 Poppit Sands
 Sandy Haven
 Saundersfoot
 Tenby
 Whitesands Bay

See also

 UK coastline
 Castlemartin Training Area

References

External links

 

National parks in Wales
Geography of Pembrokeshire
Coast of Pembrokeshire
Protected areas established in 1952
Tourist attractions in Pembrokeshire
Nature reserves in Pembrokeshire